The murder of Nofriansyah Yosua Hutabarat (sometimes also named as Joshua Hutabarat or Brigadier J), a 27-year-old Indonesian National Police officer, occurred on 8 July 2022 in Jakarta. The ensuing investigation included allegations of an affair, missing CCTV footage, and an attempted cover-up. The incident has been described by Indonesia Police Watch chairman, Sugeng Teguh Santoso, as "the worst scandal in the police's history".

In August 2022, Hutabarat's former boss, Inspector General Ferdy Sambo, head of internal affairs of the Indonesian National Police, along with three others and his wife, Putri Candrawathi, were charged with Hutabarat's murder. The trial began in October 2022, and on 13 February 2023, Sambo was sentenced to death after being found guilty of Hutabarat's murder. Four other defendants were also found guilty and sentenced to terms of imprisonment. Sambo and three of his co-accused subsequently appealed against their sentences. Six former police officers implicated in the cover-up received prison sentences.

Victim 
Nofriansyah Yosua Hutabarat was born on 29 November 1994 in Jambi, Indonesia, as the second child to Samuel Hutabarat (b. 1965) and Rosti Simanjuntak (b. 1968). He has an older sister named Yuni Artika Hutabarat, and a younger brother, Mahareza Hutabarat (b. 2000).

He was raised at Suka Makmur, a village in Sungai Bahar districts on Muaro Jambi Regency. Hutabarat completed high school education and then attended a test for Police officer in Jambi on 2012. He later became a member of the elite Mobile Brigade Corps. In 2019, Hutabarat was selected to be Sambo's bodyguard. Hutabarat was supposed to graduate from the Faculty of Law in Universitas Terbuka in 2022, but was killed before he could graduate.

Murder
Brigadier Nofriansyah Yosua Hutabarat was shot at the Jakarta home of Inspector General Ferdy Sambo, head of internal affairs of the Indonesian National Police, on 8 July 2022 at approximately 17:00 Western Indonesian Time. Hutabarat, a bodyguard and driver for Sambo, was said to have died after he was shot execution style by another member of the protection team, 'Bharada E', allegedly after Hutabarat sexually harassed Sambo's wife, Putri Candrawathi. After the shooting, Hutabarat was transported by ambulance to a hospital where he was pronounced dead, though news of the shooting was delayed until 11 July 2022.

Controversy 
On 9 July 2022, Hutabarat's body arrived in his family home in Jambi, but the police didn't allow family members to open the casket and take pictures of the body. After discussions with the family, the police finally allowed a few close family members to open the casket. The family alleged that the police only gave a very short time for them to view Hutabarat's body. The relatives reportedly discovered multiple bruises, facial incisions, a burn mark and finger injuries on his body.

On 11 July 2022, the relatives alleged that hundreds of police officers, in a bus and 10 cars, were intimidating them by "encircling" their houses, and demanding them to not record any photos and videos. On the same day, Brigadier General Hendra Kurniawan, who represented Indonesian National Police when returning Hutabarat's body to his family, stated that he didn't allow photos and video recordings to be made because the case is related to sexual violence, as Hutabarat allegedly harassed Candrawathi. Later, the family alleged that Brigadier General Hendra Kurniawan was intimidating the family by preventing them from opening the casket. The family buried Hutabarat without any police ceremony on the same day.

On 18 July 2022, Hutabarat family's lawyer went to the police to report premeditated murder of Hutabarat. Hutabarat's family contested the police account of events, claiming he was killed in a "premeditated murder" after being tortured over an alleged affair with Sambo's wife. The police account of the shooting was also questioned by the family's legal team, doubting that Hutabarat, a trained marksman, would miss with all seven shots he fired during the gunfight, and questioning why he had been shot with a Glock 17 pistol – an unlikely weapon for a junior officer. Hutabarat was also said to have received death threats, including the day before he was killed. Contacts and messages from his mobile phones had also been deleted, while CCTV cameras at the house were initially said to be out of order before footage was uncovered from around the crime scene. Hutabarat's family lawyer also alleged that the WhatsApp of Hutabarat's close family members had been hacked, and his mobile phone was missing. On 22 July, the police clarified that the Hutabarat's missing mobile phone was still confiscated because it was still being analyzed by the Forensics Division.

The controversy prompted the national police to intervene, with police chief General Listyo Sigit Prabowo taking over the investigation, forming a special team including members of the National Human Rights Commission and Police Commissions. Sambo was suspended from 18 July 2022, while three police generals and 25 officers were reportedly transferred for interfering with the investigation. Indonesia's Coordinating Minister for Political, Legal and Security Affairs, Mahfud MD, said the result of the second autopsy would be made public.

On 27 July, Hutabarat's body was exhumed and subjected to a second, independently scrutinised autopsy at Sungai Bahar General Hospital in Muaro Jambi. Reported on 22 August, the second autopsy showed that all wounds on Hutabarat's body were gunshot wounds, and that there are no torture marks on his body, as had been alleged by his family lawyer team.

Hutabarat's body was reburied in a police ceremony after the autopsy. Candrawathi criticised the burial ceremony, claiming a police burial ceremony should not be given to police officers that had committed a crime. On 28 July, Candrawathi claimed to be suffering from heavy trauma and was being treated by psychologists due to Hutabarat's alleged harassment.

Suspects

Murder charges

On 4 August 2022, another of Sambo's assistants, second patrolman Eliezer Pudihang Lumiu, was charged with murder after the initial self-defence explanation was overruled and it was seen as an intentional killing.

On 7 August 2022, Kuat Ma'ruf, Candrawathi's personal assistant, was charged with premeditated murder. The police stated that Ma'ruf had planned to flee. Ma'ruf allegedly knew about the plan to murder Hutabarat, but did not report the plan to the authorities. He had allegedly threatened to murder Hutabarat in Magelang with knives a few days before the shooting. Ma'ruf was also present when Lumiu was ordered by Sambo to shoot Hutabarat.

On 8 August 2022, Brigadier Ricky Rizal, one of Candrawathi's bodyguard, was arrested and charged with premeditated murder. Rizal allegedly was present when Sambo ordered Lumiu to shoot Hutabarat. Rizal, like Ma'ruf, allegedly knew about the plan to murder Hutabarat and refused to report the crime to the authorities. On the same day, Lumiu applied for justice collaborator status under Indonesian witness protection program.

Then, on 9 August 2022, Sambo was taken into custody and charged with premeditated murder, which carries the death penalty or life imprisonment. It was later alleged that patrolman Lumiu had been promised immunity from prosecution by Sambo if he followed through with Sambo's version of the shooting. Despite the assurance of Sambo, Lumiu continued to be the sole suspect for the murder, prompting Lumiu to provide the police with a more accurate and open testimony that contradicted Sambo's version of the event.

General Listyo told a press conference that Sambo had fired multiple pistol shots into a wall in an attempt to show a gunfight had led to Hutabarat's death; there had been no shoot-out – Sambo had orchestrated Hutabarat's killing.

On 15 August, Indonesian Witness and Victim Protection Agency approved Lumiu to act as a justice collaborator, and he was taken into the witness protection program. The agency also rejected Candrawathi's request to be a justice collaborator as her testimonies contained discrepancies.

On 19 August 2022, it was reported that Candrawathi was also facing a primary charge of premeditated murder, and a secondary charge of murder. Candrawathi claimed that she had been sexually violated by Hutabarat; a few days earlier, police stopped their investigation concerning the alleged sexual harassment, as there were no criminal actions.

On 26 August 2022, Sambo was dishonorably discharged or dismissed (PTDH) from the police force. A few days before his dismissal, Sambo had attempted to resign, a letter of which was rejected by the police chief General. Hutabarat's lawyer alleged that Sambo's resignation attempt was because Sambo opted to be honorably dismissed and retain his pension. Sambo has stated that he will appeal the dismissal decision.

Police scandal
On 22 August 2022, the Indonesian National Police transferred 24 officers, including six middle- to high-ranking individuals implicated in the incident now facing dishonourable discharge, for violating the police code of ethics. Of 83 officers who allegedly violated the code following Hutabarat's shooting, 35 received recommendations for incarceration while 15 were detained over code violations. Sugeng Teguh Santoso, chairman of Indonesia Police Watch, told The Jakarta Post: "This is the worst scandal in the police’s history. Imagine 62 people who were supposed to enforce the law voluntarily breaking the law and jeopardizing their future."

Obstruction of justice 
As of 2 September 2022, six high ranking police officers have been charged with obstruction of justice. The six police officers allegedly fabricated events and manipulated evidence. The high-ranking officers are: Brigadier General Hendra Kurniawan, Adjunct Commissioner Irfan Widyanto, Chief Commissioner Agus Nurpatria, Adjunct Chief Commissioner Arif Rachman Arifin, Police Commissioner Baiquni Wibowo, and Police Commissioner Chuck Putranto. Previously, the police clarified that Sambo has not been charged with obstruction of justice.

On 2 September 2022, the ethical board of Indonesian National Police dismissed Putranto and Wibowo without honor. On the same day, Sambo also claimed that Kurniawan and Nurpatria did not participate in the destruction of the DVR of the CCTV close to Sambo's home. On 7 September 2022, Nurpatria was dismissed without honor.

On 5 September 2022,  police chief General Prabowo stated that the police had received reports that three Regional Chief of Police had also participated in the coverup.

Reactions

Public 
On 22 July, a small gathering gathered on Bundaran HI in Jakarta to light 1,000 candles demanding justice for Hutabarat. After gathering for 30 minutes, the police peacefully dispersed the gathering, citing violation of the law as Bundaran HI is a prohibited location for public gatherings.

On 27 July, an anonymous contributor to Indonesian Wikipedia was reported to the police for editing Police Inspector General Fadil Imran's Wikipedia article to allege that Imran had been bribed by Sambo.

On 26 August, Masril, a man from Pekanbaru, Riau, was arrested for posting allegations of Sambo being connected to gambling on his TikTok account. Masril was charged with violations of Electronic Information and Transactions Law. The police decided to do restorative justice and released Masril after holding him for 23 days.

On 31 August, a majority of Indonesians polled believed the Indonesian National Police would fully solve the case.

On 3 September, a woman in East Nusa Tenggara was taken to the police station and interrogated for likening traffic police in her area as Sambo on her social media. She was released later.

Officials 
Indonesia's president Joko Widodo was keen for the force to be open about what happens: "Open it as it is. No cover-up. Transparent. That’s it. This is important so that the people don’t have doubts over the incident that occurred. This is what has to be maintained. Public trust in the police must be maintained." Jokowi reiterated multiple times that the case must be solved transparently.

Trials

Murder trials
The murder trial of Sambo, his wife, two police officers and a driver – all facing charges of premeditated murder – started in South Jakarta District Court on 17 October 2022. Sambo was accused of ordering a subordinate to shoot Hutabarat, then shooting the wounded victim again himself to kill him. In parallel with the murder trial, seven former officers including Sambo were tried on charges of obstruction of justice related to alleged cover-ups and destruction of evidence.

In January 2023, the court rejected allegations that Hutabarat had raped, sexually assaulted or had an extramarital affair with Sambo's wife, Putri Candrawathi. Prosecutors said Candrawathi had invented the story that she had been raped by Hutabarat, and had repeatedly changed her version of events leading up to the shooting.

On 13 February 2023, Sambo was found "legally and convincingly guilty" of the premeditated murder of Hutabarat and sentenced to death. Verdicts and sentences regarding Candrawathi and the three other accused followed later in the week. Sambo's role as a law enforcer was seen by observers as a factor in the court imposing the maximum sentence – Ardi Manto Saputra, deputy director of human rights group Imparsial said Sambo had "tainted the reputation of law enforcement and the government's dignity".

Candrawathi received a 20-years prison sentence for her role in the murder; her personal assistant Kuat Ma'ruf was given 15 years, and Ricky Rizal Wibowo was given a 13-year sentence (in all three cases, the prosecution had requested eight-year terms). On 15 February 2023, Richard Eliezer Pudihang Lumiu was sentenced to 18 months in prison for his role in the murder; the prosecution had requested a twelve-year term but he was given a lighter sentence for his efforts as a justice collaborator.

On 15 and 16 February 2023, lawyers for four defendants (Ma'ruf, Sambo, Candrawathi and Rizal) submitted appeals against their sentences; prosecutors lodged counter-appeals.

Obstruction of justice trials
On 27 February 2023, South Jakarta District Court sentenced two former police officers, Hendra Kurniawan and Agus Nurpatria, to three and two years in prison respectively, for their role in the attempted cover-up of Hutabarat's murder. For similar offences, Baiquni Wibowo and Chuck Potranto each received one-year prison sentences; Irfan Widyanto and Arif Rahman Arifin were each sentenced to 10 months in prison.

References

2022 murders in Indonesia
2022 scandals
2020s in Jakarta
Indonesian murder victims
Indonesian police officers
July 2022 crimes in Asia
July 2022 events in Indonesia
Police brutality in Asia